Hayden Frances Dunham (born June 16, 1988) is a performance artist, designer, singer, songwriter and DJ. They grew up in Austin, Texas and attended the Gallatin School of Individualized Study at NYU.

They are best known for their work as QT (an initialism for Quinn Thomas) a music project founded in 2014, in collaboration with English producer A. G. Cook, and Scottish producer Sophie. QT is a pop singer, portrayed by Dunham and sung by Harriet Pittard, who promotes and is the living embodiment of the semi-fictitious DrinkQT energy drink. Their debut single "Hey QT" was released in 2014.

Dunham began operating under the pseudonym Hyd in 2020, releasing their debut single "No Shadow" in September 2021. A four-track EP was released November 5. Hyd's debut album Clearing was released on November 11, 2022, via PC Music.

Career

2014–2016: QT 

Before the QT project, Dunham had done work as a designer and artist. They met Scottish producer Sophie after the two had seen each other at various events. They found Cook, head of the PC Music record label, through his work online. Dunham originally wanted to do a song as a way to market a QT energy drink, and asked the producers to repeat the name regularly.

QT is, in effect, a virtual character. The concept drew comparisons to the 2002 science fiction film Simone and the virtual Japanese pop star Hatsune Miku. The project includes DrinkQT, an "energy elixir" with a design by Kim Laughton. The music and drink are intended to be two manifestations of the same product. Both have been described as "fizzy" and "energetic", with Dunham stating that they wanted "to be able to talk about 'Hey QT' and have DrinkQT talk about 'Hey QT' and 'Hey QT' talk about DrinkQT." The drink was distributed at performances, and in May 2015 DrinkQT was made available for pre-order. Journalist Sasha Geffen described it as tasting "like Red Bull, only a little more tart." Distributing the drink was a source of friction with the Red Bull Music Academy's sponsorship of a PC Music show.

2017–2019: Art and musical hiatus 
The QT project would take various forms after 2016, such as an official short film and DJ sets, but lay mostly dormant. Dunham took a musical hiatus and worked on multiple art exhibitions and projects in this time, notably a performance piece at MoMa titled 7 Sisters in early 2019.

2020–present: Hyd 
August 2020 marked a return to music, as Dunham appeared on A. G. Cook's debut album 7G, under the pseudonym Hyd, featuring again on his second album Apple only a month after. Cook teased Hyd solo material throughout the promotion cycles of the two albums.

In September 2021, Hyd's debut single "No Shadow" was released via Cook's PC Music label. It was written after a temporary period of Dunham losing their eyesight in 2017. "Skin 2 Skin", co-produced by Cook and American musician Caroline Polachek, was also released as a single. A 4-track self-titled EP was released on November 5, 2021, and they performed a number of live shows, including one at a PC Music event at Pitchfork Music Festival London. Hyd released a cover of Nick Cave and the Bad Seeds' "Into My Arms" in January 2022, produced by Easyfun.

Dunham released the Polachek-produced single "Afar" in July 2022. On September 8, 2022, they released the single "So Clear", featuring posthumous production from Sophie and Easyfun, and announced their debut album Clearing.

Discography

Studio albums

Extended play

Singles

References

External links
 

Musical groups established in 2014
XL Recordings artists
American electronic music groups
American pop music groups
British electronic music groups
British pop music groups
21st-century American singers

1988 births
Living people